Jari Vandeputte (born 14 February 1996) is a Belgian professional footballer who plays as a midfielder for Italian  club Catanzaro.

Career
He made his debut on 27 July 2013 in the first round of the 2013–14 season against Waasland-Beveren. He replaced Hannes van der Bruggen after 57 minutes. He delivered an assist for Carlos Diogo. The game ended 1–1.

On 2 September 2019 he signed a 2-year contract with Vicenza after the first season he signed an extension with the club until 30th June 2023.

On 22 July 2021, he joined Catanzaro on loan. On 1 August 2022, Vandeputte returned to Catanzaro on a permanent basis and signed a three-year contract.

References

External links

1996 births
Living people
Footballers from Ghent
Belgian footballers
Association football forwards
Association football midfielders
Belgian Pro League players
Challenger Pro League players
K.A.A. Gent players
K.S.V. Roeselare players
Eerste Divisie players
FC Eindhoven players
Serie B players
Serie C players
U.S. Viterbese 1908 players
L.R. Vicenza players
U.S. Catanzaro 1929 players
Belgian expatriate footballers
Expatriate footballers in the Netherlands
Expatriate footballers in Italy
Belgian expatriate sportspeople in the Netherlands
Belgian expatriate sportspeople in Italy
Belgium youth international footballers